The 2018–19 Northern Ireland Football League Cup (known as the BetMcLean League Cup for sponsorship purposes) was the 33rd edition of Northern Ireland's football knock-out cup competition for national league clubs, and the fifth edition of the competition as the Northern Ireland Football League Cup. This season's League Cup was contested by all 36 clubs of the three divisions of the Northern Ireland Football League. The competition began on 4 August 2018 with the first round, and concluded on 16 February 2019 with the final. The competition was sponsored by McLean Bookmakers.

Dungannon Swifts were the defending champions, after they defeated Ballymena United 3–1 in the 2018 final to win the competition for the first time and record the first ever senior trophy win since their formation in 1949. This season, Linfield were the eventual winners, defeating Ballymena United 1–0 in the final. Linfield were playing in the League Cup final for a record 13th time, and lifted the trophy for a record tenth time overall and the first time since they won the 2008 final 11 years earlier. Ballymena United appeared in the League Cup final for the third consecutive year - their fourth appearance in five years - and were consigned to defeat in the final for the second successive year and the third time in five years.

Format and schedule
The competition was played in a straight knock-out format and was open to the 36 members of the Northern Ireland Football League. Replays were not used in the competition, with all matches using extra time and penalties to determine the winner if necessary.

Results
The league tier of each club at the time of entering the competition is listed in parentheses.

First round
The matches took place on 4 August 2018.

|}

Second round
The matches took place on 28 August 2018 and 12 September 2018. The top 16 league clubs from the previous season were seeded in this round in order to avoid drawing each other.

|colspan="3" style="background:#E8FFD8;"|28 August 2018

|-
|colspan="3" style="background:#E8FFD8;"|12 September 2018

|}

Third round
The matches took place on 9 October 2018 and 30 October 2018.

|colspan="3" style="background:#E8FFD8;"|9 October 2018

|-
|colspan="3" style="background:#E8FFD8;"|30 October 2018

|}

Quarter-finals
The matches took place on 13 November 2018, 20 November 2018, and 4 December 2018.

|colspan="3" style="background:#E8FFD8;"|13 November 2018

|-
|colspan="3" style="background:#E8FFD8;"|20 November 2018

|-
|colspan="3" style="background:#E8FFD8;"|4 December 2018

|}

Semi-finals
Both matches took place on 11 December 2018.

|}

Final
The final was played on 16 February 2019 at Windsor Park.

References

Lea
2018–19 European domestic association football cups
2018-19